Thumpstar is a pit bike manufacturer that was founded in Australia in 2004 by Timothy Hunter, a motor-cycle dealer and racer.

History
Hunter came across a pit bike at a 2003 Trade fair. He considered that he could improve on the model and make his own pit bikes. In April 2004 with the assistance of a Taiwanese Company Thumpstar bikes began to be produced.

First two years
The first Thumpstar models were released into the market between 2004 and 2006. They were the JNR 90cc, Super Hunge 110cc and the Professional Hunge 125cc. The most successful was the Professional Hunge with its CNC TUV certified full billet T6 heat treated alloy frame. Thumpstar became a well-known pit bike brand with global sales turnover reaching more than A$45 million in its first 13 months of business.

Problems with infrastructure and Trademark infringements by other company's selling counterfeit Thumpstar's caused its demise.

Terra Moto
Learning from this, Hunter, in 2007, changed Thumpstar's name to Terra Moto and secured its intellectual property. But unlike Thumpstar, the models didn't sell well and shortly after manufacturering ceased.

New Beginnings
In 2012, an agreement was signed May 10, to restart the company with 3 new models: the TSX 88cc, TSX 125cc and TSR 160cc. From 2013 Thumpstar began developing junior motocross bikes, releasing its TSB-C, TSX-C and TSR-C competition models in 2015. Thumpstar's have competed in the world mini moto champs in Las Vegas, with riders including Mike Brown, Dan Cartwright and Mike Leavitt.

By 2015 Thumpstar was making sixteen models from 50cc to 250cc and five varieties: the TSB(basic), TSX(Mid-Range), TSR(Racing), TSK(Kids) and TSC(Competition). The bikes were designed for youths, trail riding, Motocross and pit bike racing. In April 2015 Thumpstar declared Chartreuse as its official colour.

Improvement
In 2016 model upgrades include Pipe Bomb DW-1 Exhaust on the TSX and TSR models to obtain better performance.
Ts300 2 stroke introduced.
The TSR 150 advantages from additional improvements to suspension, damping and handling with the newest designed rear linkage, whereas the TSX 140 enjoys a brand new seven Series aluminium rims and an upgraded exhaust. The TSK 50 has been fully redesigned and created as child friendly as attainable, together with smaller geometry, front and rear brake controls on the handlebars and removable training wheels.

Frame design
Thumpstar was the first pit bike company to manufacture bikes with an alloy frame. The model Pro Hunge 25 which used the alloy frame was one of Thumpstar's most popular models, as it was lightweight and performed well. This model can be found in countries around the world.

Models
Hunge 10 (discontinued)
Hunge 25 (discontinued)
TSB 70 
TSB 110 
TSB 125 
TSB 125 3D 
TSX 88 
TSX 125 LE 
TSX 125 SW 
TSX 125 BW 
TSX 140 SW 
TSX 140 BW 
TSR 88 PRO 
TSR 125 PRO 
TSR 150 3D 
TSR 160 PRO SW 
TSR 160 PRO BW 
TSK 50 
TSK 52 
TSK 110e

References

External links

Minibikes
Motocross
Off-road racing
Dirt biking
Motorcycle manufacturers of Australia
Australian companies established in 2004